Yevhen Petrovych Kushnaryov (January 29, 1951 – January 17, 2007) was Ukrainian politician. Kushnaryov was considered one of the chief ideologues of the Party of Regions and a key ally of Prime Minister Viktor Yanukovych.

Early life

Yevhen Kushnaryov was born in Kharkiv to migrants from Russia in 1951. He graduated from the Kharkiv Engineering-Construction Institute in 1973, and for several years thereafter worked at a local factory of concrete and steel manufacturing.

Political career

Kushnaryov became a member of the Communist Party in 1981. In 1989, during the Glasnost era, he joined the pro-democracy movement in the Ukrainian SSR. In 1990 Kushnaryov was elected to both the Kharkiv city council and the Verkhovna Rada, where he took part in formulating the fledgling country's constitution, and in 1994 he became mayor of the city of Kharkiv.

Afterwards, Kushnaryov served as Leonid Kuchma's chief of staff from 1996 to 1998, and as governor of the Kharkiv Oblast from 2000 to 2004.

During the election crisis of 2004, Kushnaryov agitated for the creation of an independent southeastern Ukrainian state in the case of Viktor Yushchenko's victory. This caused him to be arrested on charges of separatism, that were eventually dropped. Following the Orange Revolution, Kushnaryov joined Viktor Yanukovych's Party of Regions and in 2006 he was elected to the Verkhovna Rada on the Party of Regions ticket.

Kushnaryov quickly became one of the leaders of the party along with Yanukovych and Rinat Akhmetov. Considered by many to be among the party's main ideologues, Kushnaryov could be frequently seen on television debating public policy. In 2005 he published a book (Red Horse: Notes of a Counterrevolutionary) denouncing the Orange Revolution.

Death and remembrance

On January 15, 2007, Kushnaryov was accidentally shot in the liver while hunting with a group of friends and colleagues, and died two days later in a hospital in Izium. A two-day period of mourning was declared in Kharkiv over the death of the former governor. Yevhen Kushnaryov was survived by his wife, two children, and two grandchildren.

In October 2008 a monument to honour Kushnaryov was unveiled in Kharkiv. The Yevgeny Kushnaryov Foundation for Democracy Initiatives Support was founded in October 2007. The goal of the organisation is "to pursue with the ideas that mattered to him".

Honors and Distinctions
 Order of Prince Yaroslav the Wise V (1998), IV (2002), III (2004) Class (Ukraine)
 Légion d'honneur (1997) (France)

Trivia
 Although his Ukrainian name was Yevhen (Євген), Kushnaryov personally preferred to use the Russified form Yevheniy (Євгеній) when writing in Ukrainian.

See also
 List of mayors of Kharkiv

References

External links
Personal Webpage 
The Yevgeny Kushnaryov Foundation for Democracy Initiatives Support

1951 births
2007 deaths
Politicians from Kharkiv
Russians in Ukraine
Recipients of the Legion of Honour
Accidental deaths in Ukraine
Firearm accident victims
Deaths by firearm in Ukraine
Party of Regions politicians
First convocation members of the Verkhovna Rada
Fifth convocation members of the Verkhovna Rada
Mayors of Kharkiv
Governors of Kharkiv Oblast
Head of the Presidential Administration of Ukraine
Hunting accident deaths
Recipients of the Order of Prince Yaroslav the Wise, 3rd class
Recipients of the Order of Prince Yaroslav the Wise, 4th class
Recipients of the Order of Prince Yaroslav the Wise, 5th class